Briza media is a perennial grass in the family Poaceae and is a species of the genus Briza.

Common name includes quaking-grass, common quaking grass, cow-quake, didder, dithering-grass, dodder-grass, doddering dillies, doddle-grass, earthquakes, jiggle-joggles, jockey-grass, lady's-hair, maidenhair-grass, pearl grass, quakers, quakers-and-shakers, shaking-grass, tottergrass, wag-wantons

Description
Grows to 40cm and flowers June to September in the UK. Characterised by fine stems and hops-shaped green and purple spikelets. Distinguished from the closely related Briza maxima by the size of the flower spikelets.

Distribution and habitat
This grass species is common in England and Wales  It grows in dry calcareous grassland. Its seeds are consumed by many farmland birds.

References

Pooideae
Grasses of Europe
Plants described in 1753
Taxa named by Carl Linnaeus